Stolidosoma is a genus of fly in the family Dolichopodidae.

Species

 Stolidosoma abbreviatum Parent, 1928
 Stolidosoma abdominale Robinson, 1967
 Stolidosoma acutum Robinson, 1967
 Stolidosoma bicolor Parent, 1934
 Stolidosoma currani (Van Duzee, 1931)
 Stolidosoma cyaneum Becker, 1922
 Stolidosoma eques (Loew, 1864)
 Stolidosoma flavicauda (Van Duzee, 1931)
 Stolidosoma flavidum Robinson, 1967
 Stolidosoma hexachaetum Robinson, 1967
 Stolidosoma inornatum Robinson, 1967
 Stolidosoma lucidum Becker, 1922
 Stolidosoma microgamum (Parent, 1928)
 Stolidosoma obscurum Parent, 1931
 Stolidosoma permutans Becker, 1922
 Stolidosoma unispina (Van Duzee, 1931)
 Stolidosoma varipes Robinson, 1967
 Stolidosoma violaceum (Van Duzee, 1929)

References

Dolichopodidae
Dolichopodidae genera
Diptera of North America
Diptera of South America
Taxa named by Theodor Becker